The 1918 Southwest Texas State football team was an American football team that represented Southwest Texas State Normal School—now known as Texas State University–as an independent during the 1918 college football season. Led by G. B. Marsh in his third and final year as head coach, the team finished the season with a record of 4–2–1. Squatty Williams was the team's captain.

Schedule

References

Southwest Texas State
Texas State Bobcats football seasons
Southwest Texas State Bobcats football